Roger Ward (born 1936) is an Australian actor who has had a considerable career in film and television, noted for "tough guy" roles in which he often did his own stunts.

Biography
Ward was born in Adelaide, South Australia in 1936.

His career began at an early age with roles on stage and radio. In his late teens he travelled to Tahiti to begin writing what became the controversial novel and film, The Set. The film was produced in 1970 but the novel was not published until 2011.

He was script editor for Homicide, adapted his novel Reflex into the film Brothers and wrote other documentaries and specials. Ward has featured or starred in over fifteen hundred television shows and more than fifty films with such stars as Marlon Brando, Trevor Howard, Richard Harris, Barry Sullivan, Robert Lansing, Ryan O'Neal, Richard Benjamin, Tom Selleck, Paula Prentiss, Peter Graves, Alan Rickman, Steve Railsback, Olivia Hussey and Laura San Giacomo.

In Mad Max (1979), he created the memorable bald headed police hall captain "Fifi"; The Man From Hong Kong had him as the bumbling Australian policeman, Bob Taylor. In Stone he was the comedic biker, "Hooks".  Turkey Shoot saw him as "Ritter" the guard from hell, and in Quigley Down Under he played "Brophy", one of the outlaw gang. He was an Irish mounted policeman in the 1978 film The Irishman and an all-singing, dancing pirate in The Pirate Movie.

He played popular characters in TV series including long-running character Frank "Weppo" Smith, the Shakespeare-spouting garbage collector in Number 96, a boxer in Boys from the Bush and also appeared in The Sullivans.

Later independent films in which he was featured include Long Weekend (2008), Bad Behaviour (2010), Elimination Game, Death's Waiting Room, Choir Girl, Debt Collector, Devils Detour, Boar and Faceless Man.

He was engaged to appear in another film in 2019.

Filmography

 Nude Odyssey (1961) as Beachcomber (uncredited)
 Mutiny on the Bounty (1962) as Minor Role (uncredited)
 Skippy the Bush Kangaroo ("Tread Lightly") (1968, TV series) as Carver
 You Can't See 'round Corners (1969) as punter (uncredited)
 It Takes All Kinds (1969) as bodyguard
 The Set (1970) as dancer at party
 Squeeze a Flower (1970) as Bosun
 Adam's Woman (1970) as Flogger (uncredited)
 Dalmas (1973) as Policeman
 Moving On (1974) as Stock Agent
 Tie jin gang da po zi yang guan (1974) as Motorcycle Thug (uncredited)
 Stone (1974) as Hooks
 The Man from Hong Kong (1975) as Bob Taylor
 Mad Dog Morgan (1976) as Trooper
 Deathcheaters (1976) as 1st Police Sergeant
 No Room to Run (1977, TV Movie) as Delivery Man
 High Rolling (1977)  as Lol
 Cop Shop (1977, TV Series) as Bailey
 The Irishman (1977) as Kevin Quilty
 Chopper Squad (1978, TV Series)  as Security Guard
 Doctor Down Under (1979, TV Series)  as Mr. Phillips
 Mad Max (1979) as Captain Fifi Macaffee
 Touch and Go (1980) as Wrestler
 The Chain Reaction (1980) as Moose
 Young Ramsay (1980, TV series) as Phil Angel
 I Can Jump Puddles (1981, TV movie) as Peter McLeod
 The Squad (1981, TV Movie)
 Bellamy (TV series) (1981) as Rafe
 Lady Stay Dead (1981) as Officer Clyde Collings
 Turkey Shoot (1982) as Chief Guard Ritter
 Sara Dane (1982, TV movie) as Johnny Pigman
 The Pirate Movie (1982) as Pirate
 Brothers (1982) as Cameraman One
 Special Squad (1984, TV Series)
 Winners (1985, TV Series) as Fergus
 Shout! The Story of Johnny O'Keefe (1985, TV movie) as Police Sergeant
 A Fortunate Life (1986, TV Mini-Series) as Martin
 Professor Poopsnagle's Steam Zeppelin (1986, TV Series)
 Poor Man's Orange (1987, TV Mini-Series) as Mr. Kilroy
 Sands of the Bedouin (1988, TV Movie) 
 Mission: Impossible (1988, TV Series) as Wilson
 Young Einstein (1988) as Cat Pie Cook
 Barracuda (1988, TV Movie) as Bill 'The Dentist'
 A Country Practice (1988-1993, TV Series) as Pat O' Connor / Inspector Poulos / Stan Plummer
 Quigley Down Under (1990) as Brophy
 Fatal Bond (1991) as Detective Greaves
 Pirates Island (1991, TV Movie) as Slavemaster
 Rough Diamonds (1995) as Merv Drysdale
 Big Sky (1997, TV Series) as Barney
 Water Rats (1997, TV Series) as Jim Lockwood
 The Gift (1997, Short) as Removalist #1
 When Good Ghouls Go Bad (2001, TV Movie) as Cheesy the Clown
 Long Weekend (2008) as Truckie
 Bad Behaviour (2010) as Voyte
 The Mighty Hand of God (2010, Short) as Him
 Turkey Shoot (2014) as The Dictator
 Observance (2015) as Conspirator
 Death's Waiting Room (2016) as Bertie
 The Debt Collector (2016) as Jimmy O'Hare 
 Boar (2017) as Blue
 Are You Scared Yet? (2018) as Gentleman Caller
 The Faceless Man (2018) as King Dougie
 Thariode: The Lost City (TBA)

Accolades
Ward won Best Supporting Actor at the Melbourne Underground Film Festival for his role in Bad Behaviour.

References

External links 
 

1936 births
Australian male film actors
Australian male television actors
Living people
Male actors from Adelaide